Beyza Rural District is a rural district (dehestan) in Beyza County, Fars Province, Iran. At the 2006 census, its population was 13,761, in 3,205 families.  The rural district has 41 villages.

References 

Rural Districts of Fars Province
Sepidan County